La Prosperidad is the fourth studio album released by the ''rock en español band Fiel a la Vega. It was released independently in 2002.

The lead guitarist Ricky Laureano takes a more prominent role, writing four songs, and co-writing another three with the singer Tito Auger. Laureano sings lead vocals on all of his four songs.

Track listing
All songs written by Tito Auger, except where noted.
 "La Prosperidad"
 "Hay Que Edificar" (Laureano)
 "Maniqueismo" (Auger, Laureano)
 "A Quien Pueda Interesar"
 "Croatto"
 "Tu y Mi Ciudad"
 "Necesarios son los Sueños" (Laureano)
 "Del Siglo XXI a Washington"
 "Que Razón te Llevaré"
 "Encontrarte es una Historia que Hoy Deberían Publicar" (Laureano)
 "El Asunto: Salcedo Sigue Siendo Mortal" (Auger, Laureano)
 "No Tan Atractiva Verdad" (Auger, Laureano)
 "Algunos Deseos"
 "Incorporado" (Laureano)
 "Banderas"

Song meanings
 Auger wrote "Croatto" in honor of the singer Tony Croatto, one of his influences. Four years later, after Croatto's death, Auger sang the song in a concert in his memory.
 Laureano wrote and dedicated "Encontrarte es una Historia que Hoy Deberían Publicar" to his wife, while Auger wrote and dedicated "Tu y Mi Ciudad" to his.
 "El Asunto: Salcedo Sigue Siendo Mortal" is a reference to the Spaniard Diego Salcedo's drowning at the hands of the Taíno Indians of the island.
 "Banderas" stemmed from some controversies that arose on the island concerning the use of national flags, and the division caused by the Navy-Vieques protests.

Personnel
 Tito Auger - lead vocals, acoustic guitar, harmonica
 Ricky Laureano - lead and acoustic guitar, vocals, cuatro
 Jorge Arraiza - bass guitar, vocals, keyboards, percussion
 Pedro Arraiza - drums, harmonica
 Papo Román - percussion

Recording
 Luar Music - executive producer
 Recorded at Digitec, San Juan, Puerto Rico, and Alfa Recording, San Juan, from March to October, 2002, by Gerardo López.
 Additional recordings by Carlos Cruz
 Assistant - Tito Peña (Alfa Recording) and Luis Burgos (Digitec)
 Mastered at Masterdisk, New York City, by Leon Zervos.

2002 albums
Fiel a la Vega albums